is the third single released by Ami Suzuki under label Avex Trax.

"Negaigoto" is a ballad, rather than an upbeat trance song like her previous Avex singles. The song debuted at number 13 on the weekly charts and has sold over 22,000 copies. "Negaigoto"'s B-side was named "Times" and was an upbeat song. All the songs were written by Suzuki.

Track listing

Live performances
12 August 2005 — Music Fighter
18 August 2005 — Utaban
26 August 2005 — PopJam

Charts
Oricon Sales Chart (Japan)

Ami Suzuki songs
2005 singles
Songs written by Ami Suzuki
Songs written by Daisuke Suzuki (musician)